The  is an outlet mall located in Gotemba, Shizuoka, Japan, near Mount Fuji. It was opened on July 13, 2000, and contains over 200 stores. The mall is managed by Mitsubishi Estate Simon Co., Ltd., a joint venture between Mitsubishi Estate and Simon Property Group.

History
The mall opened on July 13, 2000. It was extended in July 2003, and further extended in March 2008.

Access by car
from Tokyo or Nagoya: Tōmei Expressway (Gotemba Interchange)
from Hakone: National Route 138
from Lake Kawaguchi and Lake Yamanaka: National Route 138

Bus services
Free shuttle bus
for JR Gotemba Station (transfer for JR Gotemba Line, bus for Mount Fuji, Fuji Five Lakes, and highway bus for Shinjuku Station in Tokyo, JR Yokohama Station and Haneda Airport) via Tōmei Gotemba (transfer for Tōmei Expressway Bus for JR Tokyo Station, JR Shizuoka Station and JR Nagoya Station), by Free Shuttle Bus
Expressway bus
for Shinjuku Station and Tokyo Station by JR Bus Tech
for Shinjuku Station by Odakyu Hakone Highway Bus
for Ikebukuro Station by Kokusai Kogyo Bus
for Shinagawa Station by Keikyu Bus
for Yokohama Station by Fuji Express
for Tama Plaza Station and Center Kita Station by Tokyu Transse and Fujikyu Shonan Bus
Local routes
for Kawaguchiko Station (Lake Kawaguchi) via Fujisan Station (Fujikyuko Line) and Lake Yamanaka, by Fujikyu Bus
for JR Mishima Station (transfer for Tokaido Shinkansen), by Fujikyu Bus
for Hakone Ten-yu via Otome Toge (Mt. Fuji viewing spot), Sengoku (transfer for Odawara Station, Hakone Yumoto Station, Miyanoshita and Togendai (Lake Ashi)), Hakone Venetian Glass Museum, Miyagino, Gora Station (Hakone Tozan Line), Hakone Open-Air Museum, Kowaki-en and Yunessun, by Hakone Tozan Bus
for Hakone Yumoto Station (Hakone Tozan Line: transfer for Odawara Station) via Otome Toge (Mt. Fuji viewing spot), Sengoku (transfer for Togendai (Lake Ashi)) and Miyanoshita, by Hakone Tozan Bus

References

External links
 
Hakone Tozan Bus route map

Mitsubishi
Premium Outlets
Buildings and structures in Shizuoka Prefecture
Tourist attractions in Shizuoka Prefecture
Shopping malls established in 2000
Shopping centres in Japan
2000 establishments in Japan
Gotemba, Shizuoka